Fréville is a former commune in the Seine-Maritime department in the Normandy region in northern France. On 1 January 2016, it was merged into the new commune of Saint Martin de l'If.

Geography

Population

Places of interest
 The church of St.Martin, dating from the twelfth century.
 A sixteenth century manor house.

See also
Communes of the Seine-Maritime department

References

Former communes of Seine-Maritime